Preladenant (SCH 420814) was a drug that was developed by Schering-Plough which acted as a potent and selective antagonist at the adenosine A2A receptor. It was being researched as a potential treatment for Parkinson's disease. Positive results were reported in Phase II clinical trials in humans, but it did not prove itself to be more effective than a placebo during Phase III trials, and so was discontinued in May 2013.

References 

2-Furyl compounds
Para-Methoxyphenylpiperazines
Phenol ethers
Adenosine receptor antagonists